Ouray is a home rule municipality that is the county seat of Ouray County, Colorado, United States. The city population was 1,000 as of the 2010 census. The Ouray Post Office has the ZIP Code 81427.

History 

Originally established by miners seeking silver and gold in the surrounding mountains, the town at one time boasted more horses and mules than people. Prospectors arrived in the area in 1875. In 1877, William Weston and George Barber found the Gertrude and Una gold veins in Imogene Basin, six miles south southwest of Ouray. Thomas Walsh acquired the two veins and all the open ground nearby. In 1897, Walsh opened the Camp Bird Mine, adding a twenty-stamp mill in 1898, and a forty-stamp mill in 1899. The mine produced almost 200,000 ounces of gold by 1902, when Walsh sold out to Camp Bird, Ltd. By 1916, Camp Bird, Ltd., had produced over one million ounces of gold.

At the height of the mining, Ouray had more than 30 active mines. The town—after changing its name and that of the county it was in several times—was incorporated on October 2, 1876, named after Chief Ouray of the Utes, a Native American tribe. By 1877 Ouray had grown to over 1,000 in population and was named county seat of the newly formed Ouray County on March 8, 1877.

The Denver & Rio Grande Railway arrived in Ouray on December 21, 1887. It would stay until the automobile and trucks caused a decline in traffic. The last regularly scheduled passenger train was September 14, 1930. The line between Ouray and Ridgway was abandoned on March 21, 1953.

In 1986, Bill Fries, a.k.a. C. W. McCall, was elected mayor, ultimately serving for six years.

The entirety of Main Street is registered as a National Historic District with most of the buildings dating from the late nineteenth century. The Beaumont Hotel and the Ouray City Hall and Walsh Library are listed on the National Register of Historic Places individually, while the Ouray County Courthouse, St. Elmo Hotel, St. Joseph's Miners' Hospital (currently housing the Ouray County Historical Society and Museum), Western Hotel, and Wright's Opera House are included in the historic district.

Geography

Ouray is located at  (38.023217, −107.672178), in the San Juan Mountains of southwestern Colorado. The drive along the Uncompahgre River and over the pass is nicknamed the "Million Dollar Highway", although the exact origin of the name is disputed. Yankee Boy Basin is located a few miles from the town.

Climate 
Summers are warm in the day and mild to cool at night with brief thunderstorms often occurring in the afternoons in July and August sometimes resulting in intense, though short lived, rainfall. Autumn is cool and mostly clear with occasional rain. Winters are long and cold—though seldom extremely so—with considerable snowfall. Spring is generally cool with early spring often bringing the largest snowfalls; late spring into early summer (mid-May through late June) is mild to warm and is usually the driest time of year. The Köppen climate classification for Ouray is Dfb.

Economy

The majority of Ouray's economy is based on tourism. Ouray bills itself as the "Switzerland of America" because of its setting at the narrow head of a valley, enclosed on three and a half sides by steep mountains.

Much of the town tourism is focused on ice climbing, mountain biking, hiking, trail running and off-roading in four-wheel drive (4WD) expeditions into the San Juan Mountains. Ouray has also become a popular destination for motorcyclists, as it marks the beginning of the Million Dollar Highway. This stretch of highway connects Ouray to its neighboring cities of Silverton and Durango. The Million Dollar Highway is frequently regarded as one of the most beautiful roads in Colorado, but is also considered one of the most dangerous due to its sharp turns, steep ledges, and lack of guard rails. Destinations include Yankee Boy Basin, Engineer Mountain, and Black Bear Road. Recording artist (and later Ouray mayor) C. W. McCall helped make Black Bear famous in the area. His song "Black Bear Road" borrowed the phrase, "you don't have to be crazy to drive this road, but it helps", from a sign once posted somewhere at the beginning of Black Bear Pass.

Ouray is a popular destination for ice climbing. The water is supplied by a sprinkler system developed and maintained by a volunteer organization and supported by donations from local businesses, gear manufacturers and climbers. The Ouray Ice Park is free and attracts climbers from around the world. The annual Ice Festival is a weekend-long extravaganza of contests, exhibitions and instruction with many of the world's top ice climbers. Ice climbing has been a boon to the local economy as well, with hotels and restaurants that previously closed through the winter months now staying open to accommodate climbers.

There are five developed hot springs in Ouray and nearby Ridgway. These include thermal pools and vapor caves. Ouray Hot Springs is the largest facility with numerous pools.

There are numerous waterfalls along the road from Durango to Ouray, and within the city limits there are two waterfalls within easy reach. Cascade Falls is a short, 1/4 mile hike accessible from a parking lot on 8th Avenue. Box Canyon Falls is at the southwest edge of Ouray.

Ouray was originally a mining town. The largest and most famous mine is the Camp Bird Mine, the second-largest gold mine in Colorado, established by Thomas Walsh in 1896. Even though there was an operation permit filed in 2007, the mine still remains inactive. During its lifespan, the mine produced about 1.5 million troy ounces of gold, and 4 million troy ounces of silver, from 1896 to 1990. In 1995 the old milling equipment "The Crusher" was disassembled and sold to a smaller mine located in Mongolia where it operated for about two years. The vacant mine can be seen on the steep two-wheel drive road leading to the four-wheel drive roads to Yankee Boy Basin and Imogene Pass.

Demographics

As of the census of 2010, there were 1,000 people, 457 households, and 283 families residing in the city. The racial makeup of the city was 95.2% White, 0.1% (1) African American, 0.4% (4) Native American, 0.8% (8) Asian, 1.9% (19) from other races, and 1.6% (16) from two or more races. Hispanic or Latino of any race were 8.2% of the population.

There were 457 households, out of which 26.5% had children under the age of 18 living with them, 48.1% were married couples living together, 7.7% had a female householder with no husband present, 6.1% had a male householder with no wife present, and 38.1% were non-families. 32.4% of all households were made up of individuals, and 10.9% had someone living alone who was 65 years of age or older. The average household size was 2.19 and the average family size was 2.76.

In the city, the population was spread out, with 21.7% under the age of 18, 28.1% from 18 to 44, 33.2% from 45 to 64, and 17.0% who were 65 years of age or older. The median age was 45.1 years. For every 100 females, there were 101.6 males. For every 100 females age 18 and over, there were 101.8 males.

The median income for a household in the city was $36,094, and the median income for a family was $45,313. Males had a median income of $35,217 versus $27,083 for females. The per capita income for the city was $23,127. About 9.3% of families and 8.1% of the population were below the poverty line, including 7.1% of those under age 18 and 6.4% of those age 65 or over.

Transportation

 is the only paved road into or out of Ouray. It runs south to Bernalillo, New Mexico, via Durango, Colorado, and Aztec, New Mexico. The stretch of U.S. 550 that runs south from Ouray to Silverton is known as the "Million Dollar Highway".

In popular culture

 In the fall of 1968, the film True Grit was filmed in Ouray County, including some scenes in the city of Ouray and the nearby town of Ridgway, Colorado. The interior of the Ouray County Court House was also featured in the film.

 In Ayn Rand's novel Atlas Shrugged, the protagonist's secret hideaway was located in an unnamed valley in the Rocky Mountains called Mulligan's Valley or "Galt's Gulch." Rand later said that Galt's Gulch was inspired by Ouray, where Rand found inspiration to complete the novel.

 In the television series MacGyver, Ouray is the home of MacGyver's grandfather, Harry. The town and surrounds are used as the backdrop for the first-season episode, "Target MacGyver".
 Telluride native David Lavender related his experiences working at the Camp Bird Mine in the 1930s in his memoir One Man's West.
 Coors and Chevrolet have both filmed commercials in the area, particularly Twin Falls in Yankee Boy Basin.
 Major League baseball pitcher Smoky Joe Wood was born in Kansas City but grew up in Ouray.
 The opening scene to the movie Over the Top with Sylvester Stallone runs straight through downtown.
 The Netflix original series The Ranch is set in the fictional town of Garrison, Colorado, but the opening shot of the town during the credit sequence is of Ouray, and the San Juan Valley just north of Ouray.
 Ouray is a significant location In Chuck Wendig's novels Wanderers and Wayward.

See also

Outline of Colorado
Index of Colorado-related articles
Colorado
List of municipalities in Colorado
List of counties in Colorado
Ouray County, Colorado
Communities of Ouray County
Ouray Hydroelectric Power Plant
San Juan Skyway Scenic and Historic Byway

References

External links

City of Ouray website
CDOT map of the City of Ouray
History of Ouray @ The Narrow Gauge Circle web site
Ouray photos and information at Western Mining History

Cities in Ouray County, Colorado
County seats in Colorado
Colorado placenames of Native American origin
Mining communities in Colorado
San Juan Mountains (Colorado)
Hot springs of Colorado
Bodies of water of Ouray County, Colorado
Cities in Colorado